The  2016 Edo State gubernatorial election was held on 28 September, 2016 to determine the Governor of Edo State. The election was originally scheduled for 10 September, however two days before, on 8 September it was postponed due to security concerns.

The incumbent governor, Adams Oshiomhole, was ineligible to run for a third consecutive term due to term limits established in the Fifth Amendment to the Nigeria Constitution. He was succeeded by Godwin Obaseki, who defeated PDP candidate Osagie Ize-Iyamu in the election.

Electoral system
The Governor of Edo State is elected using the plurality voting system.

PDP primary
In the PDP primary election held on 20 June 2016, Osagie Ize-Iyamu polled a total of 584 votes to defeat Matthew Iduoriyekemwen, his closest rival, who had 91 votes while Solomon Edebiri scored 38 votes.

Candidates
Party nominee: Osagie Ize-Iyamu: former Chief of Staff to the Edo State governor and Secretary to the State Government
Running mate: John Yakubu
Solomon Edebiri: Businessman, philanthropist. Lost in the primary election.
Matthew Iduoriyekemwen. Lost in the primary election.

Results

APC primary
Godwin Obaseki, chairman of the Edo State Economy and Strategy Team, emerged victorious in the APC primary, winning 1,618 votes against 11 other candidates. His closest rival was Pius Odubu, the state deputy governor, who came a distant second with 471 votes. The total number of invalid votes was 41. The only female candidate in the primary, Tina Agbarha, came last with just three votes.

Candidates
Party nominee: Godwin Obaseki'': Chairman of the Edo State Economy and Strategy Team
Running mate: Philip Shuaibu'''
Pius Odubu: Edo State Deputy Governor. Lost in the primary election.
Oserheimen Osunbor: former Governor. Lost in the primary election.
Chris Ogiemwonyi: former Minister of State for Works. Lost in the primary election.

Results

General Election
A total of 19 candidates registered with the Independent National Electoral Commission. APC candidate Obaseki won the election with 52% of the vote to PDP candidate Ize-Iyamu's 41%.

The total number of registered voters in the state was 1,900,233 while 622,039 voters were accredited. Voter turnout was 613,244 and the difference in total votes won between the two major candidates was 66,310.

Results

References

Edo State gubernatorial elections
Edo State gubernatorial election
Edo State gubernatorial election